TCG Dumlupınar may refer to a number of submarines operated by the Turkish Naval Forces: They are named for the Battle of Dumlupınar in August 1923, the last battle in the Greco-Turkish War.

 , an Italian-built submarine of the Vettor Pisani type, in operation from 1931 to 1949.
 , a  transferred to Turkey by the US in 1950. The vessel and its crew perished in an accident in 1953 when they were struck by a freighter off the coast of the Dardanelles.
 , a Balao-class submarine transferred to Turkey by the US in 1972. Similar to its preceding namefellow, this vessel was also struck by a freighter in the Dardanelles, but survived the accident and continued serving until she was retired in 1986.

See also
 Dumlupınar (disambiguation)

Turkish Navy ship names